GreenSpring Computers was started in 1984 as VME Specialists. The original product focus was VMEbus cards for industrial automation. The company was founded by Leonard Lehmann and his father Henry Lehmann in Redwood City, California, United States.

Change of name
Around 1988, the company changed its name to GreenSpring Computers. With the name change came a change of focus away from VMEbus specific products to industrial automation products.  The company worked with Apple Computers and SuperMac Technologies to design and manufacture the first video cards for the new Macintosh II product family. With the new Macintosh computers came the vision that the embedded market was looking for alternatives to industrial PCs running DOS.  The RackMac became the only industrial version of the Macintosh computer available.  In addition to the main computer (RM1200) was a 14" monitor available with a touchscreen (RM1240 w/o touchscreen and RM1250 w/ touchscreen).

Acquisition
GreenSpring Computers was acquired by SBS Technologies in April 1995. In 2006, SBS Technologies was acquired by GE Fanuc Embedded Systems. The SBS headquarters in Albuquerque is now the headquarters for GE Fanuc Embedded Systems.

Original product line

Mezzanine modules
With the focus moving away from VMEbus only, Leonard brought on Kim Rubin to develop a bus independent module called IndustryPacks (IP).  IndustryPack became recognized as an industry standard for mezzanine modules and was adopted by ANSI as VITA 4. These mezzanine modules are approximately the size of a business card (99mm x 45mm). Featuring a 16 or 32 bit wide I/O interface and 50 User defined I/O pins.

Original IPs

The big advancements for IPs was when Motorola adopted the standard for their MVME162 processor line (see Motorola Single Board Computers) based on the Motorola 68040.  In a short time, there were multiple IP manufacturers and over 100 different IP modules available.

Final product line

References

External links 
VMEbus International Trade Association (VITA)

Companies based in Redwood City, California